John Garcia Gensel 
(February 16, 1917- February 6, 1998) was a Lutheran minister who ministered to the Jazz community, and the creator of Jazz ministry in New York City.

Early life 
John Garcia Gensel was born in Manatí, Puerto Rico in 1917 and baptized as a Roman Catholic by his birth parents. At the age of six he was sent alone to the United States, where he was raised in Catawissa, Pennsylvania by his aunt Fina and her husband Charles Gensel, who legally adopted him.

John Gensel earned his Bachelor of Divinity from the Lutheran Theological Seminary at Gettysburg in 1943. After being ordained into the ministry, he met Audrey Moyer Dodge while preaching at a church in Washington, D.C.; they married in 1943. Gensel served as a United States Navy chaplain in Guam during World War II. In 1948 the couple moved to Ohio where they had their first child, a girl, and later had two sons. In the early 1950s Rev. Gensel became a travelling minister providing services from a trailer called "the chapel of the good shepherd" to the Nuclear power plant in Piketon, Ohio where he was called "The Atomic Pastor". Life magazine published an article about his ministry in August 1954. In 1956 John Gensel moved to Harlem, New York City and became a Pastor to the congregation at Advent Lutheran Church (New York City).

Career 
In 1932, John Gensel heard Duke Ellington play at Berwick, Pennsylvania and fell in love with jazz. After moving to New York in 1956, John Gensel began frequenting local jazz clubs; the jazz community had often worked late hours on Saturday nights, making it difficult to attend Church on Sunday mornings; Rev. Gensel wanted to create a service which would allow their participation, and created Jazz Vespers. In 1965, Rev. Gensel was named full-time Minister to the Jazz Community; initially Jazz vespers were held at various locations including Central Synagogue.

In 1968, jazz ministry had become fully established in Saint Peter's Lutheran Church, on Lexington Avenue in New York City. Jazz musicians including Duke Ellington, Thelonious Monk, John Coltrane, Dizzy Gillespie, Miles Davis, Charles Mingus, Billy Strayhorn attended and played regularly at Jazz vespers. In 1975 Documentary Educational Resources published a portrait of Rev. Gensel which was filmed over the course of 5 years; the documentary records Duke Ellington's last concert and funeral. At Saint Peter's Lutheran Church Rev. Gensel also founded "All Nite Soul", a 12-hour jazz jam session held annually in October, starting at 5pm and continuing through the night. "All Nite Soul" continues to be held in Saint Peter's church in New York. Since the establishment of Jazz vespers, hundreds of memorial services were held by Rev. Gensel, including those held in the memory of musicians such as Duke Ellington, Dizzy Gillespie, and John Coltrane.

Rev. Gensel was a supporter of civil rights, and following the assassination of Rev. Dr. Martin Luther King Jr. he held a tribute concert in his honor at Carnegie Hall to benefit Tougaloo College, an African-American institute in Mississippi. On April 29, 1986 Duke Ellington appeared on a USPS stamp, the stamp issue was celebrated on his birthday with Rev. Gensel at Saint Peter's Lutheran Church. In 1993 Rev. Gensel received an honorary Doctor of Humane Letters from Wagner College in Staten Island, New York. In 1994, after serving the jazz community for over 30 years, Rev. Gensel retired from his congregation at Saint Peter's and Rev. Dale Lind took his place; he moved to Exchange county, Pennsylvania where he continued to hold services at local Lutheran churches.

Tributes 
In 1976, jazz musicians including Thelonious Monk gathered at Radio City Music Hall to play jazz and pay tribute to Rev. Gensel, the minister to the Jazz community. Duke Ellington composed a jazz piece for Rev. Gensel, named "The Shepherd (Who Watches Over The Night Flock)"; the piece is part of Duke Ellington's Sacred Concerts. In 1993, drummer Max Roach learned that Rev. Gensel would be celebrating his 50th wedding anniversary with Audrey Gensel as well as 50 years to his ordination on the same week, and held a celebratory concert for Rev. Gensel with the Max Roach Quartet, the Uptown String Quartet and the John Motley Singers. In 1994, a tribute concert honoring Rev. Gensel's life achievements was held in Carnegie Hall. The concert was hosted by Bill Cosby and many jazz musicians played in his honor. On September 12, 1999, Saint Peter’s Jazz Vespers introduced a new African-American worship book in the spirit of Rev. Gensel. In 2000, Stony Point Center established the "John Garcia Gensel Award for Integrating Faith and the Arts"; the first award was given that year to artist Dave Brubeck.

Death 
Ten days before his 80th birthday, John Gensel suffered a stroke and subsequent head trauma. He spent the last three months of his life in the hospital where he passed with his wife at his bedside. He was cremated and his ashes were scattered by his family.

References

External links 
 The shepherd of the night flock 

1917 births
1998 deaths
20th-century American Lutheran clergy
People from Manatí, Puerto Rico
Puerto Rican jazz musicians
Puerto Rican United States Navy personnel
United States Navy chaplains